John Day (c. 1740 – died 22 June 1774) is the first recorded death in an accident with a submarine. Day was an English carpenter and wheelwright. With the financial support of Christopher Blake, an English gambler, Day built a wooden "diving chamber" without an engine. He attached his invention to the deck of a 50-ton sloop named the Maria, which Blake had purchased for £340. The sloop's hold contained 10 tons of ballast, and two 10-ton weights were attached beneath the keel which could be released from inside the diving chamber. An additional 20 tons of ballast would be loaded on the Maria after Day had been locked inside the diving chamber.
 

On 22 June 1774, the Maria was towed to a location north of Drake's Island in Plymouth Sound, off Plymouth, England. Day took a candle, water and biscuits on board. The boat was equipped with a hammock for the passenger. After the boat was locked, the weights were loaded and the boat sank forever into the depths. Day had the calculation of the trim completely wrong. It has been speculated that Day may have died from asphyxiation, hypothermia or catastrophic structural failure of the Maria and/or the diving chamber due to water pressure. This incident was the first recorded fatal accident involving a submarine.

See also 
 History of submarines

References 

1774 deaths
18th-century British inventors
Accidental deaths in England
British submarine accidents
Date of birth unknown
English underwater divers
Inventors killed by their own invention
People who died at sea
Underwater diving deaths
Year of birth uncertain
Year of birth unknown